The High Sierra Trail (HST) is a hiking trail in Sequoia National Park, California.  The trail crosses the Sierra Nevada from west to east. According to the Yosemite Decimal System, the HST is a Class 1/Class 2 trail, which means simple scrambling, with the possibility of occasional use of the hands for balance.

Route 
From the plateau of the Giant Forest at Crescent Meadow (elevation ) the trail travels high on the northern wall of the canyon of the Middle Fork of the Kaweah River to Bearpaw Meadow. This first  of the trail is a popular though strenuous two-day round trip hike. The Bearpaw Meadow High Sierra Camp (a simple tent hotel) located here dates back to 1934.

After following along the Kern River, it turns east and climbs parallel to Wallace Creek to the junction with the John Muir Trail and Pacific Crest Trail  from Crescent Meadow. This is the end of the High Sierra Trail. Hikers may continue on the John Muir Trail  to the summit of Mount Whitney.

The fastest claimed time to traverse is 15 hours 46 minutes, by Leor Pantilat.

Work began on the High Sierra Trail in 1928, and it was the first Sierra trail built solely for recreational use.

Hikers should check with park rangers before planning a trip with riding or pack stock. At least one section of the trail is closed to stock, and grazing is limited in many areas.

References 

 
 
 USGS 7.5 minute maps through which the trail passes: Lodgepole, Triple Divide Peak, Mt. Kaweah, Chagoopa Falls, Mount Whitney, Mount Langley

Hiking trails in California
Long-distance trails in the United States
Sequoia National Park
Protected areas of Tulare County, California
1928 establishments in California